Tallinna JK Dünamo is a football club in Tallinn, Estonia. They are currently playing in the III Liiga, the fifth level of Estonian Football, having last played in the Estonian top tier in 2005.

History
The club was formed in 1940 and won ten Estonian SSR championships.  In 2004, the club made an unexpected return to Estonian top flight Meistriliiga, when Tervis turned out to be ineligible for promotion.

Originally, the club also played bandy, becoming Estonian champions of this sport in 1941.

Achievements
Estonian SSR Championship: (10)
1945, 1947, 1949, 1950, 1953, 1954, 1978, 1980, 1981, 1983.

Estonian SSR Cup: (7)
1946, 1947, 1949, 1953, 1972*, 1979, 1983.

*As "Kopli Dünamo"

Statistics

League and Cup

References

External links
 Dünamo at Estonian Football Association
 Dünamo at soccerway.com

Dunamo Tallinn
Dunamo Tallinn
Association football clubs established in 1940
Tallinn
1940 establishments in Estonia
Bandy clubs in Estonia
Bandy clubs established in 1940